PS Gael was a passenger vessel operated by the Great Western Railway from 1884 to 1891

History

This paddle steamer was launched on 9 March 1864 and completed on 11 February 1867 She was named by Miss Minnie Galbraith, daughter of Andrew Galbraith Esq, Johnstone Castle, ex-Provost of Glasgow and spent most of her years in Scotland. She was owned by the Clyde and Campbeltown Steam Packet Joint Stock Company.

She was bought in 1884 and operated by the GWR, mainly on its Weymouth routes but also for a time at Milford Haven and from 1887 - 1889 at Penzance for the West Cornwall Steam Ship Company. In 1891 she returned to the Clyde for duties on routes from Glasgow to Oban, Tobermory and Gairloch.

She was scrapped in 1924.

References

1867 ships
Clyde steamers
Passenger ships of the United Kingdom
Paddle steamers of the United Kingdom
Steamships of the United Kingdom
Ships built on the River Clyde
Ships of the Great Western Railway
Transport in the Isles of Scilly